Marcella Mesker (born 23 May 1959) is a former professional tennis player from the Netherlands.

Mesker was active on the WTA Tour from 1979 to 1988 and reached the final of the Australian Open Women's Doubles in 1979. She also reached the semifinals of the US Open Women's Doubles in 1984. She won a singles title in Oklahoma City in 1986.

WTA career finals

Singles 1 (1–0)

Doubles 14 (6–8)

External links
 
 
 

1959 births
Living people
Dutch female tennis players
Sportspeople from The Hague
Tennis commentators
20th-century Dutch women
21st-century Dutch women